The siege of Dublin was an unsuccessful attempt of the last high king of Ireland, Ruaidrí Ua Conchobair, to capture the City of Dublin from the English in 1171.

Ua Conchobair was allegedly able to gather sixty-thousand men for his cause, meanwhile, the city was held by Strongbow; who had proven his martial prowess just a few months prior, when another Irish army had attempted to seize the city, but Strongbow had been able to drive the besiegers off with a sally.

Ua Conchobair divided his forces into four camps and during the night Strongbow led a surprise attack on Ua Conchobair's camp, killing a thousand and a half, causing the rest of Irish forces to rout.

References 

1171 in Ireland
Dublin 1171
O'Conor dynasty
Battles involving England